The 2019 Women's European Volleyball Championship was the 31st edition of the Women's European Volleyball Championship, organised by Europe's governing volleyball body, the CEV from 23 August to 8 September 2019. For the first time the Women's EuroVolley was held in four countries: Hungary, Poland, Slovakia and Turkey. The number of national teams participating in the event was also expanded from 16 to 24.

Qualification

Pools composition 
The drawing of lots is combined with a seeding of National Federations and performed as follows:
The four Organisers are seeded in Preliminary pools. Turkey in Pool A, Poland in Pool B, Hungary in Pool C and Slovakia in Pool D.
The first and second best ranked from the previous edition of the CEV competition are drawn in different Preliminary pools,
According to the CEV National Team ranking list as per 2 October 2017, National Federations are seeded by descending order in a number of cups that equals the number of Preliminary pools.

Result
The drawing of lots was held on 23 January 2019 at the Basketmakers' Kiosk in Istanbul.

Squads

Venues

Pool standing procedure 
 Number of matches won
 Match points
 Sets ratio
 Points ratio
 If the tie continues as per the point ratio between two teams, the priority will be given to the team which won the match between them. When the tie in points ratio is between three or more teams, a new classification of these teams in the terms of points 1, 2, 3 and 4 will be made taking into consideration only the matches in which they were opposed to each other.
Match won 3–0 or 3–1: 3 match points for the winner, 0 match points for the loser
Match won 3–2: 2 match points for the winner, 1 match point for the loser

Preliminary round

Pool A 
All times are Further-eastern European Time (UTC+03:00).

|}

|}

Pool B 
All times are Central European Summer Time (UTC+02:00).

|}

|}

Pool C 
All times are Central European Summer Time (UTC+02:00).

|}

|}

Pool D 
All times are Central European Summer Time (UTC+02:00).

|}

|}

Final round 
All times in Turkey are Further-eastern European Time (UTC+03:00).
All times in Poland, Hungary and Slovakia are Central European Summer Time (UTC+02:00).

Round of 16 
|}

Quarterfinals 
|}

Semifinals 
|}

Third place 
|}

Final 
|}

Final standing

Individual awards

Most Valuable Player
  Tijana Bošković
Best Setter
  Maja Ognjenović
Best Outside Spikers
  Brankica Mihajlović
  Miriam Sylla
Best Middle Blockers
  Eda Erdem Dündar
  Agnieszka Kąkolewska
Best Opposite Spiker
  Tijana Bošković
Best Libero
  Simge Şebnem Aköz

See also
2019 Men's European Volleyball Championship

References

External links
Official website
Photos from Pool C HUN

2019
Women's European Championships
Championships, 2019, Women
Championships, 2019, Women
Championships, 2019, Women
Championships, 2019, Women
2019 in Czech sport
2019 in Hungarian women's sport
2019 in Polish sport
2019 in Turkish women's sport
August 2019 sports events in Turkey
September 2019 sports events in Turkey